James Robert Mitchell (October 19, 1947 – October 20, 2007) was an American professional football player who was a tight end for 11 seasons with the Atlanta Falcons in the National Football League (NFL). A 6'2", 234 lbs. tight end from Prairie View A&M University, Mitchell was selected to the Pro Bowl after the 1969 and 1972 seasons. After leaving the NFL, Mitchell coached football at Morehouse College and Morris Brown College in Atlanta, Georgia, supporting the tradition of football at historically black colleges and universities. Jim Mitchell has three sons and a daughter: Damian Mitchell, Brandon Hodges, a football player at Bethune-Cookman University who has a major in Pre-med Chemistry, and Chanee Lee, a N.C Central graduate with a masters in Business. And two grandchildren: Justin Mitchell who is a scholar at Lakeside High School in Atlanta, GA. And Jordan Mitchell.

External links
Death Notice 

1947 births
2007 deaths
American football tight ends
Atlanta Falcons players
National Conference Pro Bowl players
People from Shelbyville, Tennessee
Prairie View A&M Panthers football players
Western Conference Pro Bowl players